Hocine Ziani (born in Sidi Daoud on 3 May 1953) is an Algerian painter and artist in plastic arts.

Early years
Ziani was born in 1953 in a Kabyle family living in the countryside of lower Kabylia near Zawiyet Sidi Amar Cherif and not far from the course of Oued Sebaou in the current Boumerdès Province. He then spent his childhood in cultural isolation in the first years which coincided with the start of the Algerian revolution.

In 1964, two years after the independence of his country, he enrolled in the primary school of Sidi Daoud at the age of 11 and devoted himself to drawing and art as a self-taught. He joined his internship studies in an accounting college in the nearby town of Bordj Menaïel in 1969, then moved to Algiers in 1973 to continue his studies and obtain an accountant position in a national company.

From November 1974 to February 1977, he performed his military service in the Algerian desert within the Algerian Army, and on this occasion, he discovered the Sahara, in particular the Hoggar and the culture of the Tuaregs. As soon as he returned to civilian life, where he found his professional activity in accounting in 1978 he dropped the profession for art.

Career

Algeria
In 1979, he organized his first individual exhibition in an Algiers gallery, and then joined other artists to found the group of 35 which included M'hamed Issiakhem, Mohamed Temam, Mohammed Khadda, Denis Martinez, Ismaïl Samsom, Choukri Mesli, Ali Ali-Khodja, Hellal Zoubir, Ali Silem, Moussa Bourdine, Mohamed Louaïl, Ali Kerbouche and Tahar Ouamane.

In 1983, the Algerian government, under the chairmanship of Chadli Bendjedid, called on all national visual artists to found a museum dedicated to the history of the country. Ziani then contributed to this project through his works which are generally large format, and which will later enrich the collections of government or presidential institutions.

After a decade of production drawn from the historical theme, Ziani gradually turned away from specialization became interested in the theme of natural spaces, people and fantasies. He then favors free spaces treated in the blur, to give depth to his compositions, and this unlike historical canvases which are very crowded.

The themes of Ziani's paintings started to diversify, and in the spring of 1989, his wish to experiment with other techniques led him to learn lithography when he discovered an old press in one of the workshops of Villa Abd-el-Tif. With the help of his colleague Rachid Djemaï, he put the lithographic machine back into working order, andwith his friend Salah Hioun, painter and engraver, made his first printing tests.

Abroad
In 1992, he left for Paris when Salafist terrorism in Algeria set the country ablaze, where he met the art dealer Daniel Lasnon, running an art gallery. They started collaborating and in 1933 Lasnon organized for Ziani individual and collective exhibitions in Paris, Brussels and in several large cities of France. After his first Parisian exhibition in 1993, Ziani left Algiers and settled in Paris, then in September 1994 he moved to Strasbourg.

In 1997, Ziani joined the Opera Gallery run by businessman and art dealer Gilles Dyan, who presented his works internationally. In this time he won several artistic prizes, including the Prix de l'Académie des Beaux-Arts in Paris.

In 2003, he started collaboration with art dealer Victor Perahia who offered him the services of his gallery permanently exhibiting works by Salvador Dalí, Arman, Georges Braque, Louis Toffoli, Claude Weisbuch and others.

In 2010, Ziani along with Layachi Hamidouche, Tahar Ouamane, Rachid Djemaï and Noureddine Zekara represented Algeria at the international painting exhibition organized in South Africa by FIFA. He was responsible for training the group of five artists representing his native country.

In March and April 2013, the city of Chaumont organized a retrospective of his painting of various genres and  subjects including the history of Algeria, Venice, still lifes and portraits or horses.

The city of Luxeuil-les-Bains asked Ziani in 2018 for his orientalist works, of which ten of his paintings joined those of Paul Élie Dubois at the Tour des Échevins museum to constitute an exhibition entitled ”Orientalism, crossed views between Paul-Elie Dubois and Hocine Ziani” that lasted from April till October 2019.

Works

Ziani produced paintings in which he used a rich plastic vocabulary, where realism, hyperrealism, impressionism and semi-abstraction interact. Through a game of contrast between foreground and background, it's the burst of light that particularly characterizes his works.

In his works, he explores all the games of shadows and reflections, of contrasts and gradients. As a figurative painter, he creates paintings from the real world while drawing his artistic effects from the resources of the imagination.

Many of his works belong to collections of governmental and presidential institutions in Algeria, France, Morocco, United Arab Emirates, Venezuela, Cuba, Argentina, the royal family of Saudi Arabia, and are also present in private collections throughout the world.

Several of his painted works have been the subject of official acquisitions by several institutions, such as The National Museum of Fine Arts of Algiers, The Central Army Museum, Algiers, The Ministry of Culture, Algiers, The People's National Assembly, Algiers, The Artéum Contemporary Art Museum, Châteauneuf-le-Rouge (Aix-en-Provence), The City Museum of Schwarzach, Germany.

Main exhibitions
Several galleries and exhibitions presented Ziani's works:
Algiers: Galerie El-Mougar, 1st individual exhibition, 1979
Algiers: Galerie El-Mougar, Groupe35, 1981
Titograd: traveling exhibition Groupe35, 1983
Sofia: Groupe35 exhibition, 1983
Algiers: Palace of Culture, Bourdine group, Djemai, Kerbouche and Ziani, 1990
Paris: Galerie de la Place, 1993, 1996, 2005
Paris: Opera Gallery, 1998, 2000, 2002, 2008
Paris: Galerie Art-Cadre, 2003, 2004, 2005, 2006, 2007
Singapore: Opera Gallery, 1997, 1998, 2000, 2001, 2002
Paris: Salon des Artistes Français, 1997, 1998, 1999, 2000, 2001
New York: Opera Gallery, 2000, 2001
Brussels: Brussels Stars Art Gallery, 1994
Nîmes: South Gallery, 1995
Luxembourg: Galerie Becker, 1998
Saint-Dié: The European Biennial of the Thirty, 1998
Heusden: Oocker Gallery, 2002
Strasbourg: Galerie Froessel, 1993, 1995
Aix-en-Provence: Arteum Museum, 2001
Sharjah: Art Museum, 2005
Roanne: Museum of Fine Arts, 2006
Lyon: Art-Club gallery, ex-galerie de la Place, 2007
Dubai: Opera Gallery, 2008, 2010
Thonon-les-Bains: Franco-Swiss meeting, guest of honor, 2008
Abu Dhabi: Authority for Culture and Heritage, 2009
Brandérion Cap'Orient: The Great Figuratives in Brittany, 2009
Zillisheim: Salon International, guest of honor, 2009
Johannesburg: representation of Algeria at the international exhibition of countries qualified for the FIFA World Cup - FIFA, 2010
Endingen: Internationale Kunstmesse, guest of honor, 2010
Paris: 13th Salon des Peintres du Marais, guest of honor, 2011
Kaysersberg: Atmosphere of Venice, thematic exhibition, 2012
Strasbourg: St-Art, one-man-show, Art-Cadre Gallery, 2012
Chaumont: at the Chapelle des Jésuites, retrospective organized by the city of Chaumont, 2013
Strasbourg: Orient and Venice, Galerie de l'Agora, Council of Europe, 2013
Paris: Ad Vitam Aeternam, group exhibition (Brayer, Buffet, Dali, Laporte, Tobiasse, Toffoli, Weisbuch, Ziani), Pérahia gallery, 2014
Rosheim, France: solo exhibition "Praise of Wisdom", 2015
Schwarzach, Germany: at the Church of St. Peter and Paul, solo exhibition "The spirit of wine", 2017
Luxeuil-les-Bains, Art dans la Rue fair, guest of honor, 2017
Vittel: Vittel international painting and sculpture exhibition, guest of honor, 2018
Nogent: Salon Epon'Arts, guest of honor, 2019
Duttlenheim: Art67, 5th biennial, edition sponsored by Ziani, 2019
Luxeuil-les-Bains: Exhibition at the Musée de la Tour des Echevins, "Orientalism, crossed views between Paul-Elie Dubois and Hocine Ziani", 2019
Colombier: 26th Salon d’Art, 2020.

Awards
 Diploma of Honor, awarded by Algerian President Chadli Bendjedid, Algiers, 1987.
 Charles Ernest Beulé Prize from the Académie des Beaux-Arts, Paris, 1997.
 Several times medalist at the Salon of the Société des Artistes Français, Paris, 1997–1999.
 Gold medal, Salon International, Vittel, 1998.
 First Grand Prix, Salon des Seigneurs de l'Art, Arles, 1998.
 First Grand Prix, Grand Gala National, Nantes, 1999.
 First Grand Prix, gold medal, Salon International, La Grande-Motte, 2000.
 Prize awarded by the Arts-Sciences-Lettres Academic Society, Paris.
 Medal of the City of Paris, 2019.

See also
List of Algerian people
List of Algerian artists
Figurative art
Orientalism
Contemporary art
National Museum of Fine Arts of Algiers

Bibliography
Catalogue Exposition au Palais de la Culture, Alger 1990. 
Catalogue Peinture algérienne contemporaine, Alger 1992.
Catalogue Rétrospective 92, Alger 1992. 
Dernières Nouvelles d'Alsace, Julie Carpentier, "l'Algérie de Hocine Ziani, 1995.
Tassili Magazine, juin-aout 2001, "Ziani, la douceur poétique des choses humbles", par Ali El-Hadj Tahar.
Les artistes de l'Algérie, Élisabeth Cazenave, Éditions Bernard Giovanangeli. 2001, 
Abdelkader le magnanime, Bruno Étienne et François Pouillon, Collection Découvertes, Éditions Gallimard./IMA, 2003.
Arts Actualités, magazine, mars 2003, "Ziani, l'Esprit berbère", par Thierry Sznytka.
Beaux-Arts Magazine, hors série, "l'Algérie des Peintres, de Delacroix à Renoir", 2003.
Dictionnaire des artistes modernes et contemporains, Drouot Cotation, Éditions 2001 et 2002.
Ziani, les lumières de l'histoire, entretiens avec François Pouillon, CPS Éditions, Alger 2002.
Arts Actualités, magazine, mars 2003. Hocine Ziani, l'Esprit berbère, par Thierry Sznytka.
Abd el-Kader, le magnanime, de Bruno Étienne et François Pouillon. , 93, 94 et 95. Editions Gallimard 2003. .
Dictionnaire Culturel de l'Orientalisme, p.6, de Christine Peltre, Editions Hazan, Paris. , septembre 2003
Orientalisme, Christine Peltre, . . Editions Terrail, 2004.
Les Plus Belles Enveloppes Illustrées, Pierre-Stéphane Proust, Éditions Normandie Terre des Arts. . Décembre 2004.
Les plus belles enveloppes illustrées, Pierre-Stéphane Proust, décembre 2004, 
Explorations artistiques au Sahara, Elisabeth Cazenave. Editions Ibis Press, novembre 2005. , 150, 153.
Abd El-Kader, édition en danois, par A.W. Dinesen. décembre 2006. 
Dessins et Peintures, magazine , mai-juin 2008, Ziani, la magie d'une lumière venue du sud, article d'Andrée Maennel.
Commander of the Faithful, John W. Kiser. . . Editions Monkfish, 2008. 
Diwan Al Fen, dictionnaire des Peintres, Sculpteurs et Designers Algériens de Djamila Flici guendil, ed. enag-Anep, Alger 2008. 
L’art en Algérie, répertoire bibliographique 1844- 2008 de Saadia Sebbah et Mansour Abrous, ed. Casbah, Alger 2009.
Abdelkader, Un spirituel dans la modernité, Aya Sakkal, Éditions Albouraq, 2010.
Mémoire algérienne, Achour Cheurfi, Dictionnaire biographique, Éditions Dahleb, 2011.
Histoire de la peinture en Algérie : continuum et ruptures, Anissa Bouayed, 2012.
Le cheval algérien, Claire Veillères, juin 2013, .
Dictionnaire Biographique des peintres algériens, Mansour Abrous, Alger, 2014.
Carrefours d'Alsace, revue , juillet-aout 2015, page 11, texte de Bertrand Schlund.
Représenter l'Algérie, Nicholas Schaub. , 138.  cths INHA, 2015.
Gmünder Sterne, magazine en allemand, 2015, "Das Lüchtlingskind Jesus", texte du curé de paroisse Robert Kloker.
Pratique des Arts, magazine, décembre 2016 - janvier 2017, page 60, texte de Jean-Pierre Parlange.
Univers des Arts, magazine, été 2017, . 30e Festival International d'Art à Luxeuil-les-Bains.
Art Animalier, le cheval dans l'art contemporain, Editions Abbate-Piolé, mars 2018, .
Abdelkader, sous la direction de François Pouillon, Editions Snoeck, février 2019, . Catalogue exposition Musée la Piscine, Roubaix.

Monograph

References

External links
 Galerie Pérahia, Paris, art gallery permanently presenting works by Ziani

1953 births
Living people
Algerian people
People from Sidi Daoud
People from Baghlia District
People from Boumerdès Province
Kabyle people
Algerian artists
Algerian painters
Contemporary painters
Algerian contemporary artists
20th-century Algerian artists
21st-century Algerian artists